The Qiantang terrane is one of three main west-east-trending terranes of the Tibetan Plateau.

During the Triassic, a southward-directed subduction along its northern margin resulted in the Jin-Shajing suture, the limit between it and the Songpan-Ganzi terrane.  During the Late Jurassic and Early Cretaceous, the Lhasa terrane merged with its southern margin along the Bangong suture. This suture, the closure of part of the Tethys Ocean, transformed the Qiantang terrane into a large-scale anticline. The merging of the Lhasa and Qiangtang terranes resulted in the uplift of a palaeoplateau known as the Qiangtang Plateau, which rapidly thinned later in the Cretaceous.

See also

Qiangtang terrane related (from south to north)
 Geology of the Himalaya
 Indus Suture Zone 

 Transhimalaya, includes following:
 Lhasa terrane 
 Karakoram fault system

 High pressure metamorphic terranes along the Bangong-Nujiang Suture Zone
 Qiangtang terrane

References

Notes

Sources
 
 

Geology of Tibet
Historical tectonic plates
Terranes